What Comes After the Blues is the first full-length recording by what became the Magnolia Electric Co. touring line-up, and the second album released by Jason Molina under that name. It was recorded in November 2003 by Steve Albini at his Electrical Audio studio in Chicago.

Track listing

Personnel
 Jason Molina - electric and acoustic guitar, vocals
 Jennie Benford - acoustic guitar, vocals
 Mike Brenner - steel guitar
 Jim Grabowski - piano, mellotron
 Jason Groth - electric and acoustic guitar, vocals
 Michael Kapinus - Wurlitzer, piano, trumpet, vocals
 Dan MacAdam - violin
 Mark Rice - drums
 Pete Schreiner - bass guitar

References

2005 albums
Jason Molina albums
Secretly Canadian albums
Albums produced by Steve Albini